The interlobar arteries are vessels of the renal circulation which supply the renal lobes. The interlobar arteries branch from the lobar arteries which branch from the segmental arteries, from the renal artery. They give rise to arcuate arteries.

References

External links
  - "Renal Vasculature: Efferent Arterioles & Peritubular Capillaries"
  - "Urinary System: neonatal kidney, vasculature"
 Diagram at eku.edu
 
 

Kidney anatomy